Claudia Kohde-Kilsch and Jana Novotná were the defending champions but only Novotná competed that year with Tine Scheuer-Larsen.

Novotná and Scheuer-Larsen won in the final 6–4, 6–2 against Andrea Betzner and Judith Wiesner.

Seeds
Champion seeds are indicated in bold text while text in italics indicates the round in which those seeds were eliminated. The top four seeded teams received byes into the second round.

Draw

Final

Top half

Bottom half

References
 1988 Citizen Cup Doubles Draw

1988 WTA Tour